Tola-Binyeri is a district in the Mayo Belwa local government area of Adamawa State, Nigeria.  It stretches alongside the Shebshi Mountain. It has a District Head.

Villages
 

Gambe

References

Populated places in Adamawa State